Moland is an unincorporated community in Rice and Steele counties in the U.S. state of Minnesota.

The center of Moland is generally considered near the intersection of Lamb Avenue and 270th Street E / NE 86th Street.

Moland is located within Richland Township in Rice County; and also located within Merton Township in Steele County.

From 1882 to 1905, the community had a post office.  Moland is located within ZIP code 55946 based in Kenyon.

Portions of the community used to extend into Goodhue and Dodge counties.  Nearby places include Kenyon and Medford.

References

Unincorporated communities in Minnesota
Unincorporated communities in Rice County, Minnesota
Unincorporated communities in Steele County, Minnesota